The 1986 Spanish general election was held on Sunday, 22 June 1986, to elect the 3rd Cortes Generales of the Kingdom of Spain. All 350 seats in the Congress of Deputies were up for election, as well as 208 of 254 seats in the Senate.

The election was held after the referendum on Spanish membership in NATO in March 1986 had resulted in a surprising win for the 'In' camp headed by Prime Minister Felipe González. Reinforced from the referendum result, the Spanish Socialist Workers' Party (PSOE) sought to take advantage of the favorable political situation. The election resulted in the PSOE winning a second consecutive—albeit diminished—majority with 184 out of 350 seats. Its immediate competitor, Manuel Fraga's People's Coalition, an electoral alliance formed by People's Alliance (AP), the People's Democratic Party (PDP) and the Liberal Party (PL), remained stagnant with a similar result to the one obtained in 1982 by the AP–PDP coalition. The disappointing election result caused the Coalition to break apart shortly afterwards.

Former PM Adolfo Suárez's Democratic and Social Centre (CDS) came out in third place with nearly 1.9 million votes, 9.2% of the share and 19 seats. The Communist Party of Spain (PCE) contested the election within the newborn left-wing United Left (IU) coalition, slightly improving on the PCE's result in 1982 with 4.6% and 7 seats and holding its own against the Communists' Unity Board (MUC), Santiago Carrillo's split party founded after him being expelled from the PCE, which won no seats.

Two future prime ministers (José Luis Rodríguez Zapatero and Mariano Rajoy) were first elected as deputies at this election.

Overview

Electoral system
The Spanish Cortes Generales were envisaged as an imperfect bicameral system. The Congress of Deputies had greater legislative power than the Senate, having the ability to vote confidence in or withdraw it from a prime minister and to override Senate vetoes by an absolute majority of votes. Nonetheless, the Senate possessed a few exclusive (yet limited in number) functions—such as its role in constitutional amendment—which were not subject to the Congress' override. Voting for the Cortes Generales was on the basis of universal suffrage, which comprised all nationals over 18 years of age and in full enjoyment of their political rights.

For the Congress of Deputies, 348 seats were elected using the D'Hondt method and a closed list proportional representation, with an electoral threshold of three percent of valid votes—which included blank ballots—being applied in each constituency. Seats were allocated to constituencies, corresponding to the provinces of Spain, with each being allocated an initial minimum of two seats and the remaining 248 being distributed in proportion to their populations. Ceuta and Melilla were allocated the two remaining seats, which were elected using plurality voting. The use of the D'Hondt method might result in a higher effective threshold, depending on the district magnitude.

As a result of the aforementioned allocation, each Congress multi-member constituency was entitled the following seats:

For the Senate, 208 seats were elected using an open list partial block voting system, with electors voting for individual candidates instead of parties. In constituencies electing four seats, electors could vote for up to three candidates; in those with two or three seats, for up to two candidates; and for one candidate in single-member districts. Each of the 47 peninsular provinces was allocated four seats, whereas for insular provinces, such as the Balearic and Canary Islands, districts were the islands themselves, with the larger—Majorca, Gran Canaria and Tenerife—being allocated three seats each, and the smaller—Menorca, Ibiza–Formentera, Fuerteventura, La Gomera, El Hierro, Lanzarote and La Palma—one each. Ceuta and Melilla elected two seats each. Additionally, autonomous communities could appoint at least one senator each and were entitled to one additional senator per each million inhabitants.

Election date
The term of each chamber of the Cortes Generales—the Congress and the Senate—expired four years from the date of their previous election, unless they were dissolved earlier. The election decree was required to be issued no later than the twenty-fifth day prior to the date of expiry of the Cortes in the event that the prime minister did not make use of his prerogative of early dissolution. The decree was to be published on the following day in the Official State Gazette (BOE), with election day taking place between the fifty-fourth and the sixtieth day from publication. The previous election was held on 28 October 1982, which meant that the legislature's term would expire on 28 October 1986. The election decree was required to be published in the BOE no later than 4 October 1986, with the election taking place on the sixtieth day from publication, setting the latest possible election date for the Cortes Generales on Wednesday, 3 December 1986.

The prime minister had the prerogative to dissolve both chambers at any given time—either jointly or separately—and call a snap election, provided that no motion of no confidence was in process, no state of emergency was in force and that dissolution did not occur before one year had elapsed since the previous one. Additionally, both chambers were to be dissolved and a new election called if an investiture process failed to elect a prime minister within a two-month period from the first ballot. Barred this exception, there was no constitutional requirement for simultaneous elections for the Congress and the Senate. Still, as of  there has been no precedent of separate elections taking place under the 1978 Constitution.

Background
Shortly after assuming office on 2 December 1982, Prime Minister Felipe González had to face a worsening economic situation, with high inflation, soaring unemployment and a public deficit at 6%. Among the new PSOE government's first economic measures were the nationalization of the Rumasa holding due to its financial situation and because of alleged fraudulent practices and continuous evasion from the inspection activity conducted by the Bank of Spain, the reduction of work time to 40-hour week and the establishment of a minimum legal annual leave of 30 days and a lunch break of 15 minutes.

This period saw major reforms being implemented in order to achieve economic recovery as well as equalization of Spain with the remainder of Europe, including an unpopular economic stabilization plan involving a process of industrial restructuring—which led to the closure of many obsolete industries—and a reform of the pension system which lengthened the period used to calculate full pension benefits from 10 to 15 years and adopted a new system for pension revaluation. This economic policy received widespread criticism from trade unions—including the historically PSOE-aligned UGT—leading to strikes and demonstrations opposing the government's economic policy. A new labor reform was approved, which included fiscal incentives to investment, added protection for unemployed and the easing of temporality through the implementation of fixed-term contracts. González's first term also saw the establishment of the Spanish National Health System and universal health care in Spain, and decriminalization of abortion in three cases: therapeutic in cases of serious risk to the physical or mental health of the pregnant woman, during the first 12 weeks; criminological in cases of woman rape, during the first 22 weeks; and eugenic in cases of fetus malformations, at any time during pregnancy. Free and compulsory education was established until the age of 16.

Internally, these years were marked by a harsh hostile campaign from ETA, with around one hundred dead throughout the 1982–1986 period as a result of terrorist activity, which was countered with a similarly harsh government response. The PSOE government also had to deal with the issue of military insurrectionism, with a profound reorganization of the Spanish Armed Forces by promoting an increase of civil authority over the military, with the final aim of professionalizing the Armed Forces and end the threat of military coup attempts. Felipe González also came briefly involved in the 1984 German Flick affair, when SPD MP Peter Struck said in the German press that another MP from his party, Hans-Jürgen Wischnewski, had given obe million Marks from the corruption plot to González himself. The Spanish prime minister countered this with a remarkable statement at the time: "I have not received a single mark, a single penny, a single peseta, neither from Flick nor from Flock", and was later acquitted from the scandal by the inquiry commission in Congress.

Internationally, the PSOE government was successful in culminating negotiations for the Spanish entry into the European Economic Community (EEC), effective from 1 January 1986. The issue of NATO membership was more controversial, as the PSOE had campaigned for the holding of a referendum on the issue after Leopoldo Calvo-Sotelo's move to enter the alliance in May 1982. However, once in power Felipe González evolved to support NATO. According to Santos Juliá, the main factors that influenced the PSOE government's change of attitude were "pressure from the United States and several European countries; the connection between staying in NATO and Spain–EEC negotiations and the growing favorable stance of the Spanish Defence Ministry to attain closer ties with the Alliance". By 1985, as Spain had signed the Act of Accession to the EEC, preparations for the referendum on NATO membership started, being eventually held on 12 March 1986. NATO permanence option won the vote by a surprising 53.1% to 40.3%, and the PSOE came out reinforced.

Within the opposition, the Union of the Democratic Centre (UCD) was dissolved in February 1983. Under Manuel Fraga's leadership, the People's Alliance (AP) and the People's Democratic Party (PDP) joined with other parties to form the People's Coalition, seeking to build on his idea of the "natural majority" of the centre-right in order to win the next general election. At the same time, Catalan politician Miquel Roca tried to enter national politics by founding the Democratic Reformist Party (PRD), supported by the Catalan-based Convergence and Union (CiU), the Liberal Democratic Party (PDL) of Antonio Garrigues Walker and a number of regional parties, in what came to be known as "Operation Roca". All attempts at forming a common alliance between the three main centre to centre-right political forces—including the growing Democratic and Social Centre (CDS) of former prime minister Adolfo Suárez—failed throughout 1985. In the left, the Communist Party of Spain (PCE) experienced an internal crisis which saw the resignation of its leader Santiago Carrillo and his succession by Gerardo Iglesias. Internal disagreements resulted in splits that saw the birth of the Communist Party of the Peoples of Spain (PCPE) and the Workers' Party of Spain–Communist Unity (PTE-UC).

While the 1986 general election was initially expected for October, there was widespread opinion that a snap election would be held in June alongside the scheduled 1986 Andalusian regional election, with part of the government remaining ambiguous on the issue. On 21 April, Felipe González announced his intention to dissolve the Cortes Generales and call a snap election for 22 June, explaining that it was his wish to prevent "political uncertainties" resulting from an autumn election that could affect the country's economic prospects during the making of the 1987 state budget.

Parliamentary composition
The Cortes Generales were officially dissolved on 23 April 1986, after the publication of the dissolution decree in the Official State Gazette. The tables below show the composition of the parliamentary groups in both chambers at the time of dissolution.

Parties and candidates
The electoral law allowed for parties and federations registered in the interior ministry, coalitions and groupings of electors to present lists of candidates. Parties and federations intending to form a coalition ahead of an election were required to inform the relevant Electoral Commission within ten days of the election call, whereas groupings of electors needed to secure the signature of at least one percent of the electorate in the constituencies for which they sought election, disallowing electors from signing for more than one list of candidates.

Below is a list of the main parties and electoral alliances which contested the election:

Campaign

Party slogans

Spanish Socialist Workers' Party

The Spanish Socialist Workers' Party under Felipe González campaigned on a continuity platform, emphasizing on the idea of progress and trying to highlight that the party's management of government during the previous four years had been positive for the country. The democratization process after the turbulent years of the early 1980s was deemed as having been fully completed, the military insurrectionism threat had been vanquished, Spain had been integrated within Europe and the economic crisis was easening, with the brunt of the industrial conversion having been dealt with in the first years of Socialist government. It also tried to deliver on the idea that the party's programme was not yet fulfilled, with many proposals still left to be carried out. Another message of the Socialist electoral campaign revolved around the idea that a non-Socialist government would revert the political and social advances accomplished in the previous years, with PM González himself warning of a possible alternative coalition between the various centre and centre-right parties in case the PSOE lost its absolute majority.

There were notable divergences from the campaigning style of 1982: González himself, being now the Prime Minister, had a busy public agenda and was only able to participate in large campaign events during weekends, having little time to maintain direct contact with party militants. He also wanted to distance himself from direct confrontation to the other parties' candidates, usually leaving that task to Deputy Prime Minister Alfonso Guerra and other PSOE leaders, in order to emphasize his image as Chief of the Executive. The PSOE's electoral manifesto for the 1986 election also avoided making any concrete pledges such as those done in 1982.

Opposition parties had accused the PSOE government of a rudely style of ruling, of arrogance, of little austerity and of informational opacity, a result, according to them, of the large absolute majority of seats it had obtained in the 1982 election. Thus, one of the PSOE's self-imposed objectives during the election campaign was to maintain that absolute majority. In the end, the PSOE would win the election but with a significantly reduced majority of 184 seats, compared to the 202-strong majority achieved in 1982.

People's Coalition

The People's Alliance, the People's Democratic Party and the Liberal Party contested the election in a common ticket under the People's Coalition label. Some regionalist parties in different autonomous communities, such as the Navarrese People's Union in Navarre, also joined the coalition, who was to be led into the election by AP leader Manuel Fraga.

Its campaign centered into criticising the González' government record in office, accusing the PSOE of breaking many of its 1982 election pledges and asking voters to support an alternative to the Socialists, with Fraga opening the possibility to invite other parties, specially the CDS and the PRD, into a coalition government aimed at ousting the PSOE from power. The Coalition released an election programme which was described as a mixture of economic neoliberalism and social conservatism. Among the Coalition's election pledges were the privatization of public companies (the most notable example being TVE 2) and of the healthcare assistance system in order to reduce tax burden and public spending; the implementation of a national plan against drugs; the illegalization of HB and tougher penalties for terrorists (going as far as to promise an end to ETA terrorism within 6 months); a repeal of the newly approved abortion law and a revision of the divorce law.

The Coalition was criticised for its perceived right-wing stance, with serious difficulties to define an alternative policy to the PSOE, a weak opposition stance to González' government (virtually trailing the Socialists on every issue) and a lack of initiative. The Coalition's call for abstention in the March referendum (despite the party's official stance favouring Spain permanence within NATO) had been a fatal blow to its expectations in the upcoming general election, being seen, on the one hand, as a gesture of political opportunism in an attempt to weaken Felipe González' position and, on the other hand, as showing a lack of political guidance. Instead, the 'Yes' landslide victory had reinforced the PSOE in the eyes of public opinion, but the Coalition's position on the referendum was met with skepticism and disapproval from other centre-right parties, both nationally and internationally.

United Left

The roots for the United Left (IU) coalition originated during the protests to demand the exit of Spain from NATO in 1986, with the "Platform of the United Left". While the 1986 referendum had resulted in the country's permanence within NATO, sectors to the left of the PSOE sought to form a unitary candidacy for the 1986 general election aimed at representing the nearly 7 million voters that had shown their position against such a permanence. Aside from the PCE, which was to become IU's main member party, also joining the coalition were the Unified Socialist Party of Catalonia (PSUC), the Socialist Action Party (PASOC), the Republican Left (IR), the Communist Party of the Peoples of Spain or the Collective for the Unity of Workers-Andalusian Left Bloc (CUT-BAI), among others.

Aside from its anti-NATO stance, the IU coalition also opposed the Socialist government's recent industrial conversion, which had been carried out almost unilaterally and with little to no talks with trade unions, thanks to the PSOE absolute majority in Congress. IU campaigned on a left-wing platform, accusing the PSOE of abandoning its socialist roots and of applying liberal policies. On the international stage, IU promised to bring Spain out of NATO, the dismantling of US bases and the withdrawal of US troops from Spanish soil, as well as to counter "the harmful consequences of integration within the EEC, a conception of Europe against the interests of multinationals and imperialism and to support initiatives for the elimination of nuclear weapons and against the militarization of space." On the domestic stage, IU's pledges included nationalizations in the banking and energy sectors. It also provided for large investments in the public sector, an agrarian reform and a federal model of state which provided for "the full development of the rights of nationalities and regions".

Opinion polls

Results

Congress of Deputies

Senate

Outcome
The 1986 election results showed little changes to the balance of power with respect to 1982. Overall, the Spanish Socialist Workers' Party (PSOE) remained the dominant party in Spanish politics by securing a second consecutive overall majority in the Congress of Deputies. Prime Minister Felipe González was regarded to have come out reinforced from the election. With his popularity already soaring after winning the NATO referendum on March, politically turned into a plebiscite on his premiership, the election results further strengthened his political position by securing him a new mandate to continue the reforms already in place since in 1982. Nonetheless, the election unveiled the first signs of weariness of the PSOE government, as it suffered major losses in support in the major urban centers, the same that had set out the seed for González's landslide victory in 1982. In the Madrid Community the PSOE suffered the most, scoring a bare 40% from the 52% it had secured four years previously. Despite this, discontent towards the government did not translate into major inroads for other parties. Voters' apathy and the absence of strong alternatives to the Socialists translating into a substantial increase of the abstention rate, which rose to 29.5% from the 20.0% of 1982.

The centre-right People's Coalition failed to secure substantial gains from the 1982 result of the AP–PDP alliance, experiencing small gains in Castile and León, Extremadura and Melilla but falling elsewhere. Adolfo Suárez's Democratic and Social Centre (CDS) virtually took over the place of the defunct UCD with nearly 2 million votes and 19 seats. On the other hand, results for the Democratic Reformist Party (PRD) of Miquel Roca were an unmitigated disaster and a blow to Roca's national aspirations, disbanding shortly thereafter. Its Catalan counterpart Convergence and Union (CiU), however, made significant gains in the Socialist stronghold of Catalonia, dramatically closing the gap with the PSC to just 9 points from a 23-point lead in 1982. The newly formed United Left coalition was able to slightly improve over the PCE's result in 1982, despite the split of former party leader Santiago Carrillo's MUC, which was unable to gain parliamentary representation.

In the election aftermath, the People's Coalition found itself into a state of deep crisis after results showed it was unable to garner the support of the centre voters. The People's Democratic Party immediately broke away from the Coalition after the election; its 21 MPs forming their own parliamentary caucus in the Congress of Deputies, thus reducing the Coalition's parliamentary strength to 84. Manuel Fraga would resign as AP leader after the party's disastrous results in the November 1986 Basque regional election, deepening a party crisis that would last until its refoundation into the People's Party in 1989.

Aftermath

Government formation

1987 motion of no confidence

Notes

References

Bibliography

 
 
 
 

General
1986 in Spain
1986
June 1986 events in Europe